Carol Ronning Kapsner (born November 25, 1947) is a former Justice of the North Dakota Supreme Court.  Carol Ronning Kapsner was born and raised in Bismarck, North Dakota. She graduated  with B.A. degree in English literature from College of St. Catherine, studied 17th-century English literature at Oxford University, received a Master of Arts degree in English literature from Indiana University, and a Juris Doctor degree from the University of Colorado School of Law in Boulder, Colorado, in 1977.  She was appointed to the Supreme Court in 1998. She retired from active service on July 31, 2017.

Career
1977 - started the law firm of Kapsner and Kapsner
1980 - served as president of the Burleigh County Bar Association.
1988-1996 - appointed by the Bar Association to serve on the Judicial Conference
1998 -  appointed by Governor Ed Schafer to fill vacancy created by Justice Herbert L. Meschke
2000 - elected to a full 10-year term

References

External links
Carol Ronning Kapsner biography
North Dakota Supreme Court website

Living people
1947 births
American women judges
Indiana University alumni
Justices of the North Dakota Supreme Court
Politicians from Bismarck, North Dakota
St. Catherine University alumni
University of Colorado alumni
21st-century American women
20th-century American women judges
20th-century American judges
21st-century American women judges
21st-century American judges